Duke of Victoria is a Portuguese title of nobility retained by the Duke of Wellington.

The title was created by Prince Regent John of Portugal (later King John VI) on 18 December 1812 to honour the British General Arthur Wellesley, who commanded the armies that eventually defeated the troops of Emperor Napoleon I of France in the Peninsular War. It was the only grant of a Portuguese dukedom to a foreigner.

Arthur Wellesley had already received the Portuguese titles Conde de Vimeiro (Count of Vimeiro, 18 October 1811) and Marquês de Torres Vedras (Marquess of Torres Vedras, 17 December 1812), which became titles subsidiary to that of Duque da Vitória. He also received the British peerage title Duke of Wellington, and other titles and honours from the United Kingdom, Spain, and the Netherlands. All these titles have been passed to his heirs to the present day.

Dukes of Victoria since 1812 
 Arthur Wellesley, 1st Duke of Victoria (1769–1852) from 1812
 Arthur Richard Wellesley, 2nd Duke of Victoria (1807–1884) from 1852
 Henry Wellesley, 3rd Duke of Victoria (1846–1900) from 1884
 Arthur Charles Wellesley, 4th Duke of Victoria (1849–1934) from 1900 until 1934
 Arthur Charles Wellesley, 5th Duke of Victoria (1876–1941) from 1934
 Henry Valerian George Wellesley, 6th Duke of Victoria (1912–1943) from 1941
 Gerald Wellesley, 7th Duke of Victoria (1885–1972) from 1943
 Arthur Valerian Wellesley, 8th Duke of Victoria (1915–2014) from 1972
 Arthur Charles Valerian Wellesley, 9th Duke of Victoria (b. 1945) since 2014

The heir apparent is the present holder's son Arthur Gerald Wellesley, whose heir apparent is his son Arthur Darcy Wellesley.

Use of titles of nobility in the Portuguese Republic 
With the end of the Portuguese monarchy in 1910, all titles of Portuguese nobility were initially abolished. Notwithstanding, although the status of nobility has not been recognised in law since 1910, legitimate titles of nobility (those granted by a reigning monarch before the 5th October 1910) have been given legal recognition and protection, including under article 26 of the Portuguese Constitution, in conjunction with articles 70 and 72 of the Civil Code, as established by decision of Portugal's Supreme Court of Justice in 2014.

See also
 Prins van Waterloo
 Duque de Ciudad Rodrigo

References

Vitoria

1812 establishments in Portugal